Melanin-concentrating hormone receptor 1, also known as MCH1, is one of the melanin-concentrating hormone receptors found in all mammals.

The protein encoded by this gene, a member of the G protein-coupled receptor family 1, is an integral plasma membrane protein which binds melanin-concentrating hormone. The encoded protein can inhibit cAMP accumulation and stimulate intracellular calcium flux, and is probably involved in the neuronal regulation of food consumption. Although structurally similar to somatostatin receptors, this protein does not seem to bind somatostatin.

Function 

MCH1 is thought to have a number of functions including in the regulation of appetite, and in stress, anxiety and depression.

Selective ligands

Agonists 

 Melanin concentrating hormone (MCH)
 S-36057 - modified MCH 6-13 fragment substituted with 3-iodotyrosine at N-terminus via dioxyoctanoyl linker, used as 125I radioligand for mapping MCH1 in vivo.
LK-184 (Procter & Gamble) is one pick

Antagonists 

 ATC-0065
 ATC-0175
 GW-803,430
 NGD-4715
 SNAP-7941
 SNAP-94847
 T-226,296

See also 
Melanin-concentrating hormone receptor

References

Further reading

External links 
 

G protein-coupled receptors
Human proteins